Bùi Thị Thu Thảo (born 29 April 1992) is a Vietnamese athlete specialising in the long jump. She won the gold medal at the 2017 Asian Championships and the gold at the 2018 Asian Games.

Her personal bests in the event are 6.68 metres outdoors (+0.2 m/s, Kuala Lumpur 2017) and 6.36 metres indoors (Ashgabat 2017). Both are current national records.

International competitions

References

1992 births
Living people
Vietnamese female long jumpers
Asian Games gold medalists for Vietnam
Asian Games silver medalists for Vietnam
Asian Games gold medalists in athletics (track and field)
Asian Games medalists in athletics (track and field)
Athletes (track and field) at the 2014 Asian Games
Athletes (track and field) at the 2018 Asian Games
Medalists at the 2014 Asian Games
Medalists at the 2018 Asian Games
Southeast Asian Games medalists in athletics
Southeast Asian Games gold medalists for Vietnam
Southeast Asian Games silver medalists for Vietnam
Southeast Asian Games bronze medalists for Vietnam
Competitors at the 2011 Southeast Asian Games
Competitors at the 2013 Southeast Asian Games
Competitors at the 2015 Southeast Asian Games
Competitors at the 2017 Southeast Asian Games
Asian Athletics Championships winners
Asian Indoor Athletics Championships winners
21st-century Vietnamese women
Competitors at the 2021 Southeast Asian Games
20th-century Vietnamese women